Bohemian Switzerland, also known as Czech Switzerland, is a picturesque region in the north-western Czech Republic.

It has been a protected area (as Elbe Sandstone Mountains Protected Landscape Area) since 1972. The region along the right side of the Elbe became a national park on 1 January 2000, the Bohemian Switzerland National Park. The National Park is adjacent to the Saxon Switzerland National Park in Germany.

Etymology
The concept of Bohemian Switzerland developed in the 18th century as an extension of the Saxon Switzerland, the part of the Elbe Sandstone Mountains in Germany. The name was inspired by the Swiss artists Adrian Zingg and Anton Graff, who were reminded of their homeland by the geography of northern Bohemia.

Geography
Bohemian Switzerland lies on the Czech side of the Elbe Sandstone Mountains north of Děčín, on both banks of the Elbe River. It extends eastward into the Lusatian Mountains and westward into the Ore Mountains. Its highest elevation is the mountain Děčínský Sněžník at 723 m above sea level.

History

A large number of castles were built in the Bohemian Switzerland region in order to guard the trade routes. Several of these castles were also used as medieval robber baron hideouts. The region had been very sparsely populated since ancient times by a few Germanic, Slavic and Celtic tribes, but was finally colonised in the 12th century by German-speaking settlers. Until the end of the World War II it was home to German Bohemians (later known as the Sudeten Germans). Since its German population was driven out after 1945, the area has been almost exclusively settled by Czechs.

The area first began to draw tourists in large numbers in the 19th century. Artists of the Romantic era were inspired by the wild beauty of the rocks. For example, the artist, Ludwig Richter or the composer, Carl Maria von Weber, who set his famous opera Der Freischütz in the vicinity of Rathen.

National park

As early as 1972, the whole of Bohemian Switzerland was placed under protection. When, in 1990, the status of Saxon Switzerland was raised to that of a national park, efforts were stepped up to place the Bohemian part of the Elbe Sandstone Mountains under national park protection as well. A plan devised in 1991 envisaged that this would also include the Růžovský vrch (formerly Rosenberg). This plan was heavily resisted by various groups, such as the owners of hunting land and the forestry industry. A compromise proposal also fell on stony ground. In 1999 the Czech government decided to create the Bohemian Switzerland National Park to its originally envisaged extent. On 1 January 2000 the valuable forest and rock landscape, the gorges of the Kamnitz and the area around the Růžovský vrch were given national park status. The headquarters of the national park authority is located in Krásná Lípa, and there are information offices in Hřensko and Jetřichovice.

Sights

Pravčická brána, the largest natural sandstone arch in Europe
Kamnenice Gorge, a rock ravine near Hřensko
Tisa Rocks, a rock labyrinth
Děčínský Sněžník, highest mountain of Bohemian Switzerland with its observation tower
Šaunštejn Castle, a robber baron rock castle near Vysoká Lipa
Mariina skála, viewing point near Jetřichovice
Vilemínina stěna, viewing point near Jetřichovice
Rudolfův kámen, viewing point near Jetřichovice
Pavlinino údolí, the deeply incised, romantic valley of the Chřibská Kamenice stream
Falkenštejn Castle, rock castle
Rock chapel in Všemily
Belvedér near Labská Stráň, mountain
Malá Pravčická brána, natural sandstone arch
Na Tokáni, historic inn and hostel
Emperor's View on the Stoličná hora near Děčín
The well tended villages with their Upper Lusatian houses

External links

Photographs of the region
Bohemian Switzerland - about it, free download map for travellers created by locals
Bohemian Switzerland
Photos of Bohemian Switzerland
Awarded "EDEN - European Destinations of Excellence" non traditional tourist destination 2009

 
National parks of the Czech Republic
Protected areas established in 1972
Bohemia
Elbe Sandstone Mountains
Geography of the Ústí nad Labem Region
Tourist attractions in the Ústí nad Labem Region
1972 establishments in Czechoslovakia